Delta Secondary School may refer to:

Delta Secondary School (Hamilton, Ontario) in Hamilton, Ontario, Canada
Delta Secondary School, Warri in Delta, Nigeria
Delta Secondary School (Delta, British Columbia) in Delta, British Columbia, Canada
Delta Secondary School Windhoek in Windhoek, Namibia
Delta Secondary School (Singapore), a precursor of Bukit Merah Secondary School
 North Delta Secondary School, Delta, British Columbia, Canada
 South Delta Secondary School, Tsawwassen, British Columbia, Canada

See also
 Delta (disambiguation)
 Delta High School (disambiguation)